Crows Creek is a stream in Crawford and Washington counties in the U.S. state of Missouri. It is a tributary of the Meramec River.

Crows Creek most likely has the name of a pioneer citizen.

See also
List of rivers of Missouri

References

Rivers of Crawford County, Missouri
Rivers of Washington County, Missouri
Rivers of Missouri